Slovenský národný bleskozvod, also known as Dankov Stožiar, Kapitánov Monument or Kapitánov Kolík, is a flagpole built in front of the Slovak parliament building next to Bratislava Castle.

The height of the pole is 30 metres, to beat the 27 metres high flagpole built in Budapest. However, it is not even close to the record setting, 171 metres high Jeddah Flagpole built in Jeddah, Saudi Arabia.

It was later discovered that the flagpole in Budapest is 33 metres high.

Financing
Although the first estimation was that the flagpole would not cost more than 34.000 EUR incl. VAT, the final cost of the project was 58.043 EUR excl. VAT. The original plan was to have the project financed partly from donations and partly from Government budget, i.e., by Slovak tax payers. After a criticism it was fully financed from donations. The donations came from Andrej Danko (9000 EUR), Daniel Guspan (9000 EUR), Parliamentary club of Smer (5000 EUR), Robert Fico (1000 EUR) and other smaller donors, mostly the members of parliament (30.000 EUR).

Parties Most–Híd, Sloboda a Solidarita and Sme Rodina refused to participate in the project's financing, with the leader of Obyčajní Ľudia a Nezávislé Osobnosti, Igor Matovič, having stated that he would rather help other disabled people instead of Andrej Danko.

Bleskozvod (lightning rod)
Although the original idea was to only build a flagpole, the real usage was quickly found during the first heavy thunderstorm on August 25, 2019, thanks to its location on the top of a hill.

References

2019 establishments in Slovakia
Buildings and structures completed in 2019
Buildings and structures in Bratislava
Culture in Bratislava
Flagpoles